Hallmark Connections Ltd, trading as Diamond South East, is a bus operator in South East England and, through the Hotel Hoppa operation, in Greater London. It is a subsidiary of Rotala.

In addition to local bus services, Diamond South East operates the Hallmark luxury coach and corporate cars business, which was originally founded in 1913 as an independent company known as Flights Hallmark.

History
Flights Hallmark was established in 1913 in Birmingham. Over the years it has developed in the coach industry, and as at March 2008 operated over 172 buses and coaches and 51 cars. The company was purchased by Rotala in August 2005.

Rotala

Flights Hallmark bought the Surrey Connect business, which became part of Rotala shortly afterwards. It sold Surrey Connect to Wiltax in June 2007. Hallmark operates bus route 458 in Surrey, which links Kingston-upon-Thames and Staines-upon-Thames.

Flights Hallmark was rebranded to Hallmark under Rotala ownership. When Rotala subsequently launched local bus services out of the Hallmark depots, these services were branded as Hallmark Connections. In 2021, Hallmark Connections was rebranded as Diamond South East; the Hallmark brand was retained for coach services.

Current operations

Diamond South East operates eight bus routes in Surrey and South West London, 4 of which primarily serve schools and the Royal Holloway University and another one which serves Whitley Village. 

Since 6 July 2020, Diamond South East has operated route 250 between Oxford and Bicester via Hampton Poyle, Bletchingdon, Kirtlington, Lower Heyford, Upper Heyford and Middleton Stoney. They won the route from Oxford Bus Company in a recent tender renewal for Oxfordshire County Council contracts  This service ceased running on 11th February 2023 and will be partly replaced by service 24 operated by Grayline. 

Hallmark currently runs buses and coaches from a number of depots in various parts of England. These services include shuttle bus services, airline or crew transfers, private hires, tours, and VIP services such as providing coaches for football teams. Clients include: Aston Villa, Burton Albion, Ipswich, Nottingham Forest, Walsall and West Bromwich football clubs Worcester Warriors rugby club.

The chauffeur driven cars division of the business is Flights Corporate Transfers. This is usually airport transfer work.

Former operations

In 2011 Flights Hallmark became a National Express contractor. These services have since ceased.

References

External links

Hallmark website

Bus operators in the West Midlands (county)
Coach operators in England
Rotala
Transport companies established in 1913
1913 establishments in England